Guglielmo il Giuggiola (William, called the Ziziphus berry) was a 16th-century Italian poet and author of canzoni.

Canzona de' lanzi alabardieri
Canzona di lanzi che fanno schizzatoi
Canzona di lanzi venturieri

Italian poets
Italian male poets
Italian Renaissance writers
16th-century Italian poets
16th-century male writers